12:34 is the third album released by punk band Authority Zero. It was released on January 30, 2007 on Big Panda Records. Music Videos were made for the songs, "The Bravery" and "No Regrets".

Reception
PUNKnews.org reported that the album was "a step up from Andiamo, and on par with A Passage in Time. Authority Zero has delivered a solid, standout album once again."

Track listing

Notes

Authority Zero albums
2007 albums
Albums produced by Ryan Greene